Lukas Mandowen (born 6 April 1989) is an Indonesian former footballer. Previously he played for Perseru Serui and Persipura Jayapura. During youth career, he spent two seasons with the Persipura U-21. He was the top scorer of the competition Indonesia Super League U-21 at the 2009-10 season.

Honours

Club honors
Persipura Jayapura
Indonesia Super League (1): 2010–11
Indonesian Inter Island Cup (1): 2011

Country honors
Indonesia U-23
Southeast Asian Games silver medal (1): 2011

Individual honors
Indonesia Super League U-21 Top Scorer (1): 2009–10

References

External links
 Profile in Liga Indonesia Official Website
 persipurajayapura.com

1989 births
Living people
People from Sarmi Regency
Papuan people
Indonesian Christians
Indonesian footballers
Indonesian Super League-winning players
Liga 1 (Indonesia) players
Persipura Jayapura players
Indonesia youth international footballers
Association football forwards
Association football wingers
Southeast Asian Games silver medalists for Indonesia
Southeast Asian Games medalists in football
Competitors at the 2011 Southeast Asian Games
Papuan sportspeople
Sportspeople from Papua